Ioana Raluca Olaru (born 3 March 1989) is a professional tennis player from Romania. The winner of eleven singles and 15 doubles titles ITF Women's Circuit, Olaru reached one WTA Tour singles final, at the 2009 Gastein Ladies, losing to Andrea Petkovic, in straight sets. She also has won eleven doubles titles on WTA Tour tournaments.

Olaru was a successful junior player. She was the runner–up in both junior singles and doubles at the 2005 French Open, and captured the 2006 US Open doubles title along with Mihaela Buzărnescu. Her best professional Grand Slam result so far has been the third round of the 2007 French Open, when she defeated the 30th seed Julia Vakulenko, in straight sets, and lost to eventual runner–up, the seventh seed Ana Ivanovic. Olaru reached her highest singles ranking, world No. 53, on 27 July 2009, and her best doubles ranking, No. 30, on 31 January 2022.

Personal life
Ioana Raluca Olaru currently resides in her hometown Bucharest. Her parents, Adrian and Doina, run a convenience store together. Her sister Cristina is 16 years older than Olaru, and lives in London. Olaru began playing tennis aged seven, and cites Kim Clijsters, Martina Navratilova and Roger Federer as her role models. She graduated from school in 2007, and is fluent in English, Spanish and Romanian.

Tennis career
Raluca started her 2017 season at Shenzhen Open where she reached the final with Olga Savchuk, but they lost 1–6, 5–7 to Peng Shuai and Andrea Hlaváčková.
The following week, Olaru with Olga Savchuk won the doubles title at the Hobart International, it was her sixth WTA Tour doubles title.

Playing style
Olaru considers being a fighter as her biggest asset. She cites clay as her favourite surface and backhand down the line as favourite shot, but she can play well on all surfaces and she likes mixing her game with drop shots. Olaru is currently coached by Adrian Gavrila, Adrian Cruciat and Artemon Apostu Efremov.

Performance timelines
Only main-draw results in WTA Tour, Grand Slam tournaments, Fed Cup/Billie Jean King Cup and Olympic Games are included in win–loss records.

Singles

Doubles

Mixed doubles

Significant finals

Premier-Mandatory/Premier-5 finals

Doubles: 1 (1 runner-up)

WTA career finals

Singles: 1 (1 runner-up)

Doubles: 24 (11 titles, 13 runner-ups)

WTA 125 finals

Doubles: 1 (1 runner-up)

ITF finals

Singles: 18 (11 titles, 7 runner–ups)

Doubles: 31 (15 titles, 16 runner–ups)

Notes

References

External links

 
 
 

1989 births
Living people
Tennis players from Bucharest
Romanian female tennis players
US Open (tennis) junior champions
Grand Slam (tennis) champions in girls' doubles
Tennis players at the 2016 Summer Olympics
Olympic tennis players of Romania
Tennis players at the 2020 Summer Olympics